Alvis Russell Darby (born September 14, 1954) is an American former college and professional football player who was a tight end for two seasons in the National Football League (NFL).  Darby played college football for the University of Florida, and was chosen by the Seattle Seahawks in the sixth round of the 1976 NFL Draft.  He also played professionally for the NFL's Houston Oilers and Tampa Bay Buccaneers.

Early years
Darby was born in Miami, Florida.  He attended Miami Edison High School, and played high school football for the Miami Edison Red Raiders.  In the 1970 Florida Class AA state championship game, he had a 62-yard touchdown reception, contributing to the Edison Red Raiders' 42–22 victory over Fort Pierce Central.

College career
Darby accepted an athletic scholarship to attend the University of Florida in Gainesville, Florida, where he played for coach Doug Dickey's Florida Gators football team from 1973 to 1975.  He played in 35 games for the Gators, starting as a tight end as a sophomore and senior, but filling the wide receiver's slot as a junior.  On a Gators team that emphasized Doug Dickey's running game and option over the passing the game, Darby compiled 314 yards and four touchdowns on 22 receptions, with an average of 14.3 yards per catch.  During his three seasons as a Gator, the team appeared in three consecutive post-season bowl games for the first time in its history.  Memorably, he had a 32-yard reception in the 1974 Sugar Bowl.

Professional career
The NFL expansion Seattle Seahawks franchise chose Darby in the sixth round, with the 157th overall pick, of the 1976 NFL Draft.  During his 1976 rookie season, he appeared in one game for the Seahawks and two more for the Houston Oilers.  He did not play during the 1977 NFL season, but appeared in six games for the Tampa Bay Buccaneers in 1978.

See also 

 Florida Gators football, 1970–79
 List of Florida Gators in the NFL Draft
 List of Seattle Seahawks players
 List of Tampa Bay Buccaneers players
 List of University of Florida alumni

References

Bibliography 

  2013 Florida Football Media Guide, University Athletic Association, Gainesville, Florida (2013).
 Carlson, Norm, University of Florida Football Vault: The History of the Florida Gators, Whitman Publishing, LLC, Atlanta, Georgia (2007).  .
 Golenbock, Peter, Go Gators!  An Oral History of Florida's Pursuit of Gridiron Glory, Legends Publishing, LLC, St. Petersburg, Florida (2002).  .
 Hairston, Jack, Tales from the Gator Swamp: A Collection of the Greatest Gator Stories Ever Told, Sports Publishing, LLC, Champaign, Illinois (2002).  .
 McCarthy, Kevin M.,  Fightin' Gators: A History of University of Florida Football, Arcadia Publishing, Mount Pleasant, South Carolina (2000).  .
 McEwen, Tom, The Gators: A Story of Florida Football, The Strode Publishers, Huntsville, Alabama (1974).  .
 Nash, Noel, ed., The Gainesville Sun Presents The Greatest Moments in Florida Gators Football, Sports Publishing, Inc., Champaign, Illinois (1998).  .
 Proctor, Samuel, & Wright Langley, Gator History: A Pictorial History of the University of Florida, South Star Publishing Company, Gainesville, Florida (1986).  .

1954 births
Living people
Players of American football from Miami
American football tight ends
Florida Gators football players
Seattle Seahawks players
Houston Oilers players
Tampa Bay Buccaneers players
Miami Edison Senior High School alumni